Federico Riva (born 8 October 2000) is an Italian middle-distance runner.

Career
Riva won a national championship at senior level during his career.

Achievements

National titles
Riva won one national championship.
 Italian Athletics Indoor Championships
 3000 m: 2022

References

External links

2000 births
Living people
Italian male middle-distance runners
Athletics competitors of Fiamme Gialle
Italian Athletics Championships winners
Sportspeople from Rome